Eric Roger Goldsworthy AO (born 17 July 1929) is a former Australian politician and 3rd Deputy Premier of South Australia from 1979 to 1982. Goldsworthy represented the House of Assembly seat of Kavel for the Liberal and Country League and Liberal Party from 1970 to 1992. Before entering Parliament he was a farmer and teacher. He was also a member of University of Adelaide Council 1970–1973. He became deputy leader of the SA Liberals, and hence Deputy Leader of the Opposition, in 1975 when David Tonkin successfully challenged Bruce Eastick's leadership. As such, he became Deputy Premier when the Liberals won the 1979 state election, also serving as Minister of Mines and Energy, Services and Supply. He remained deputy leader when the Liberals went back into opposition in 1982 under John Olsen, and held the deputy's post until returning to the backbench in 1989.

He was active in the development and exploitation of mineral resources whilst in parliament and following his retirement. Whilst Minister of Mines, he negotiated the establishment of the Olympic Dam mine and the Cooper Basin liquid scheme and put these to Parliament. He is a member of the South Australian government's Resources Industry Development Board (RIDB).

He has been an active promoter of the mining industry in SA and a member of the South Australian Chamber of Mines and Energy (SACOME) since its formation. Goldsworthy chaired the Gawler Craton Infrastructure study for the Commonwealth Government.

He was appointed an Officer of the Order of Australia for service to Parliament and the community in 1997.

A leading member of the right wing of the South Australia Liberals, Goldsworthy retired from politics in 1992 to allow fellow right-winger and former state party leader Olsen to re-enter parliament and challenge for the leadership. Following his parliamentary career, Goldsworthy continued to support the resources sector in South Australia through his membership of the RIDB.

Education 
Roger has a Bachelor of Science degree from the University of Adelaide (Physics, Chemistry, Maths, Geology) and a Diploma in teaching.

References

 

|-

Deputy Premiers of South Australia
Liberal Party of Australia members of the Parliament of South Australia
Australian schoolteachers
Australian farmers
University of Adelaide alumni
1929 births
Members of the South Australian House of Assembly
Mining in South Australia
Officers of the Order of Australia
Living people
Liberal and Country League politicians